is a former Japanese football player.

Playing career
Takagi was born in Kyoto Prefecture on May 13, 1976. He joined Gamba Osaka from youth team in 1995. However he could not play at all in the match until 1996. In 1997, he moved to Japan Football League club Oita Trinity. However he could hardly play in the match and left the club end of 1997 season. After 1 year blank, he joined newly was promoted to J2 League club, Sagan Tosu in 1999. He played many matches as mainly left offensive midfielder in 4 seasons. He retired end of 2002 season.

Club statistics

References

External links

1976 births
Living people
Association football people from Kyoto Prefecture
Japanese footballers
J1 League players
J2 League players
Japan Football League (1992–1998) players
Gamba Osaka players
Oita Trinita players
Sagan Tosu players
Association football midfielders